Rig Muled (also Romanized as Rīg Mūled; also known as Rīgmūlet) is a village in Tukahur Rural District, Tukahur District, Minab County, Hormozgan Province, Iran. At the 2006 census, its population was 463, in 101 families.

References 

Populated places in Minab County